The Drum is an adventure novel by the British writer A.E.W. Mason which was first published in 1937. The book's action takes place on the Northwest Frontier of British India.

Synopsis
Set in the India of the British Raj, the evil and untrustworthy Prince Guhl plans to wipe out the British troops as they enjoy the hospitality of Guhl's spacious palace. It's up to the loyal young Prince Azim to warn the troops of Guhl's treachery by tapping out a message on his drum.

Film adaptation
The following year the novel was turned into a film The Drum directed by Zoltan Korda and made by London Film Productions at Denham Studios.

References

External links
 

1937 British novels
Novels by A. E. W. Mason
British novels adapted into films
Hodder & Stoughton books